The Insubric poet Caecilius Statius came from Milan, capital city of Insubres, and wrote in Latin, being one of the best Latin comedians, with Plautus and Terence.

Throughout the 13th century, the activity of Cisalpine poets in Langue d'oc continued. In Mantua, Sordello da Goito composed the Sirventese lombardesco in the local variety of the Lombard group, being the only troubadour text to be written in this language in Northern Italy. In Bologna - whose language also belongs to the Gallo-Italic group - Rayna possentissima was composed in 1254; lauda of the Servi della Vergine, the oldest lauda we know of. In the same city, the notary registers (or Memoriali bolognesi) were created for the transcription of public acts, in the span of two centuries: in the white spaces, in order to avoid illegal addings, folklore tales or literary poems were written. During this period, there had been a koine language used across the region known as Langobardia Maior.

Bonvesin da la Riva
Bonvesin da la Riva is the most important Northern-Italian writer of the 13th century. Born in Milan between 1240 and 1250, he was a secular friar belonging to the 3rd order of Umiliati and is acknowledged as doctor in gramatica, a title that few people had. His most important work is the Book of the three texts (Libro delle tre scritture), an epic poem in quatrains in Old Insubric language, in which he describes the underworld realms. The book is divided into three parts, different for style and atmosphere, in which Hell, Christ's Passion and Paradise are represented. The anticipation of Dante's Divina Commedia is evident, with an attentive use of language, with lexical and rhetoric ability. This work of art is a sort of screenplay of the afterlife, of considerable historic value and of hard poetical suggestion. The Essay on the months in form of apologue and the Vulgare de elymosinis, raw description of terrible maladies, similar to the realism of Jacopone da Todi, are also very important. A sort of Medieval etiquette is the treaty De quinquaginta curialitatibus ad mensam, lively and realistic representation inserted in the manualistic tradition of the time. The Contrasti are other poems, series of disputies, enriched by skillful alternance of descriptive tones -grotesque and soft, meditated and exemplar- like the Disputatio rosae cum viola, in which the humble bourgeois virtues of the violet prevail on the aristocratic ones of the rose. In religious works the most precious are The passion of Job, The life of Saint Alexey and overall, between Laudes de Virgine Maria, the legend of Frate Ave Maria, of touching religious intensity because of its inspiration by a strong Christian devotion.

16th century
The written use of Insubric resumes in Milan under the House of Visconti, such as in the case of Lancino Curti and Andrea Marone. The written testimoniances of Quattrocento (15th century) are still indecisive in orthography; Dei, in this century, composes the first Milanese glossary. In the 16th century, Gian Paolo Lomazzo founds the Academy of Val di Blenio, which furnishes information also about other dialects of the period. In 1606 G.A. Biffi with his Prissian de Milan de la parnonzia milanesa tried a first codification of orthography, regarding vowel length and sound /ö/ for which he found the solution ou; Giovanni Capis elaborates the first embryo of dictionary, the Varon Milanese; Fabio Varese, anticlassicist poet, realizes some thirty of humouristic-veristic sonnets in Milanese (with an answer for every sonnet in which he blames himself). Carlo Maria Maggi, great dramaturge, at the end of the 17th century definitively codifies the writing of Milanese dialect introducing French oeu, so founding the classical Milanese orthography that will be retouched in the centuries till the present version of Circolo Filologico Milanese. At the end of the 18th century you assist at some changing in the linguistic structures, such as the abolition of no (meaning "not") preposed to the verb, on behalf of postposed nò or minga, or the abolishing of past perfect, which you can yet find in Balestrieri and in Maggi.

Bosinada is a poetic form of popular composition, written in Insubric on loose sheets, told by storytellers (bositt, sing. bosin) and with often satyric contents. The first essays of the genre are at the end of the 16th century. One of the first bositt is Gaspare Fumagalli, whose we know nine bosinad of the 1723. Also greater poets such as Carlo Porta liked describing themselves as bositt, even if their poems were much more meditative than popular ones. Bosinada didn't have a rigid form: the metre could be of various sizes (lame verses were a frequent characteristic), from eight to eleven syllables long, often in rhyming couplets, in long stanzas.

17th century
Carlo Maria Maggi (born in 1630), Milanese, rector of Latin and Greek at the Scholae Palatinae, secretary of the Milanese Senate, superintendent at the University of Pavia, is considered as the father of modern Insubric literature. Between the works in Italian language there is a book of affection poems, considered by someone of the time as a good renovation, by someone else as transgressive (Accademia della Crusca denied his Lombard-origin terms); probably Maggi undertook the local language stream in antagonism to the arrogance of Tuscan conformists. His production in Milanese consists in verses and comedies. The verses are especially occasion poems that describe moments of bourgeois life. But Maggi is reminded overall as comediograph: he wrote Il manco male, Il Barone di Birbanza, I consigli di Meneghino, Il falso filosofo, Il Concorso de' Meneghini, with autonomous interludes dell'Ipocondria, per una tragedia, delle Dame sugli spassi del Carnevale, Beltramina vestita alla moda, dell'Ambizione. The keys of his theatral work are the reconciliation of the theatre with the Church (not fingering like Molière but proposing positive values), the criticism against Protestant ethics (for which success would be sign of the divine approval), the nonconformism and the patriotic idealism. It was Carlo Maria Maggi that introduced to theatre the popular mask of Meneghin, who got the personification of the Milanese people, humble, frank and honest, full of wisdom and common sense, loud in the adversities, sensitive and generous worker and cont el coeur in man, with the hearth in the hand. He died in 1699 and is buried in San Lazzaro.

18th century
In the 18th century the greater protagonists of Insubric poetry, actually limited to Milan, are Domenico Balestrieri, then very appreciated by Carlo Porta, Carl'Antonio Tanzi, Girolamo Birago, Giuseppe Parini, Pietro Verri, Francesco Girolamo Corio.

Carlo Porta (1775–1821) is the main poet in Milanese. The bulk of his production can be divided into three sections: against the religious hypocrisy of the time (e.g. in Fraa Zenever, Fraa Diodatt, On Miracol, La mia povera nonna la gh'aveva); descriptive of lively popular Milanese personages (probably the masterpieces of Porta: Desgrazzi de Giovannin Bongee, Olter desgrazzi de Giovannin Bongee, El lament del Marchionn di gamb'avert and most of all La Ninetta del Verzee, the monologue of a prostitute); the political genre, in which he shows he ardently hopes in the independence of Lombardy, yet tolerating the French rule (Paracar che scappee de Lombardia, E daj con sto chez-nous ma sanguanon, Marcanagg i politegh secca ball, Quand vedessev on pubblegh funzionari). There are also sonnets in defence of Milanese language (I paroll d'on lenguagg car sur Gorell) and of Milan (El sarà vera fors quell ch'el dis lu), besides purely humouristic poems. The prevalent poetic form is sonnet, but there are also epigrams, canzoni, bosinad etc. Porta declares Milanese as lengua del minga e del comè and appoints as school of the true language of the people the Verzee, the greens market of the city. In 1816 he founds in his house, with his dearest friends (Grossi, Berchet, Visconti etc.), the so-called Camaretta, which immediately links itself with Alessandro Manzoni and later with the romantic group of Il Conciliatore, while in the latter years the antinobiliar spirit raises. He died of gout at 46 years old at the peak of his fame.

19th century
Insubric poets of the 19th century are Alessandro Manzoni (one of the greatest writers in Italian language), Tommaso Grossi (author besides of In morte di Carlo Porta ["In death of Carlo Porta"] and of Sogn or La Prineide), Vespasiano Bignami, Giovanni Rajberti, Giuseppe Rovani, Emilio De Marchi, Speri Della Chiesa Jemoli... In this century many journals in various dialect of Insubric language were born, and also great dictionaries: the Cherubini (monumental work), the Cappelletti (trilingual: Milanese, Italian, French), the Banfi, the Arrighi and the Angiolini.

Carlo Bertolazzi (1870–1916) was a  comediograph from Rivolta d'Adda, verist, who wrote in Milanese and analyzed with a bitter popular vein the condition of underprivileged ones of Milan in the end of the 19th century. He was lawyer, notary and theatral critic. After some dramas in Italian language, he undertook Insubric playwriting, in which he hit the highlight of his art. Chorality and epicity dominate the representation, in which several individual vicissitudes are born: in this sense Giorgio Strehler has been his carefullest interpreter. His production didn't attract the attention of his contemporaries, though a moral and social sense full of modernity were in it. Between his works we remind El nost Milan, La gibigianna, L'egoista, Lulù.

20th century
Delio Tessa (born in 1886) is the greatest Milanese poet in the 20th century. Graduated in Law, he preferred to devote himself to literature, theatre and cinema. Antifascist, he remained aloof from official culture, devoting himself to local sphere. Except the collection of poems L'è el dì di mort, alegher!, all his works have been published posthumous. The topics of his poetics are the drama of the World War I and of the daily life of neglects, revised in personal way and caring very much the sonority of the lines. The theme of death is often present, with a pessimism of both personal and cultural origin (Scapigliatura, Decadentism, Russian novel, Expressionism). The restlessness is glared into the tension of the language, used as popular and highly fragmented tongue. He died in 1939 for from an abscess and was buried, according to his will, in a common field at the Musocch cemetery. In the 50s the Commune transferred him to the Famedio, the "Monumental Cemetery", noted for the abundance of artistic tombs and monuments.

Other Insubric poets of the 20th century are Giovanni Barrella (Scapigliatura complete artist, translate brush-strokes into writing), Edoardo Ferravilla, Emilio Guicciardi, Luigi Medici and Franco Loi.

References

See also 
 Insubric writers

Western Lombard language
Literature by language
European literature